Panchendriyas (Sanskrit: पञ्च इन्द्रिय) are the sense organs of the human body according to Hinduism, consisting of mind and action, each consisting of five subtypes. Five buddhi-indriyas or Jnanendriyas ("mental or senses") and five Karmendriyas ("sense organs that deal with bodily functions").

Five Jnanendriyas

Jnanendriya is the organ of perception, the faculty of perceiving through the senses. The first five of the seventeen elements of the subtle body are the "organs of perception" or "sense organs". According to Hinduism and Vaishnavism there are five Jnanendriyas or "sense organs" – ears, skin, eyes, tongue and nose.

Five Karmendriyas

Karmendriya is an Indian philosophical concept. Karmendriya is the "organ of action" according to Hinduism and Jainism. Karmendriyas are five, and they are: hasta, pada, bak, anus, upastha. In Jainism these are the senses used by the experiencing soul to perform actions.

See also
 Panchakosha
 Kosha

References

External links
 Indriya Pancha Phanchaka: 5 Five Of Sense Organs
 The Five Senses – Pancha Indriya - Eat & Breathe
 Pancha Indriya Buddhi: Association cortices, Kshama Gupta, Prasad Mamidi

Indian philosophical concepts
Hindu philosophical concepts